is a Japanese politician serving in the House of Representatives in the Diet (national legislature) as a member of the Democratic Party of Japan. A native of Shimonoseki, Yamaguchi and high-school graduate he was elected to the Diet for the first time in 1990 after serving in the union executive and local assemblies for 15 years.

Honours 
  Grand Cordon of the Order of the Rising Sun (2018)

References

External links 
  in Japanese.

Living people
1945 births
People from Shimonoseki
Democratic Party of Japan politicians
Members of the House of Representatives (Japan)
Japanese trade unionists
21st-century Japanese politicians
Grand Cordons of the Order of the Rising Sun
Education ministers of Japan
Culture ministers of Japan
Science ministers of Japan
Sports ministers of Japan
Technology ministers of Japan